Cui Yu (born 27 June 1989) is a Chinese footballer.

Early life 
On June 28, 1989, Cui was born in China.

Career statistics

Club

Notes

References

1989 births
Living people
Chinese footballers
Association football defenders
Singapore Premier League players
China League One players
Beijing Guoan F.C. players
Dalian Transcendence F.C. players